Swainsonia ocellata , common name the eyed mitre, is a species of sea snail, a marine gastropod mollusk in the family Mitridae, the miters or miter snails.

Subspecies
 Swainsonia ocellata ocellata (Swainson, 1831)
 Swainsonia ocellata sublevigata (Bozzetti, 2016)

Description
The length of the shell varies between 13 mm and 34 mm. The shell is roughly spindle-shaped, white towards the apex and brown towards the base, with striations and a row of reddish spots.

Distribution
This marine species occurs in the Indo-West Pacific; also off Madagascar

References

 Poppe G.T. & Tagaro S.P. (2008). Mitridae. pp. 330–417, in: G.T. Poppe (ed.), Philippine marine mollusks, volume 2. Hackenheim: ConchBooks. 848 pp.

External links
 
 Swainson W. (1829-1833). Zoological Illustrations, or original figures and descriptions of new, rare, or interesting animals, selected chiefly from the classes of ornithology, entomology, and conchology, and arranged according to their apparent affinities. Second series. London: Baldwin & Cradock. (Vol. 1-3): pl. 1-30
 Fedosov A., Puillandre N., Herrmann M., Kantor Yu., Oliverio M., Dgebuadze P., Modica M.V. & Bouchet P. (2018). The collapse of Mitra: molecular systematics and morphology of the Mitridae (Gastropoda: Neogastropoda). Zoological Journal of the Linnean Society. 183(2): 253-337

Mitridae
Gastropods described in 1831